Philbrook is a locational surname of British origin. An alternative spelling is Philbrick. The surname spread to America when Thomas Philbrick emigrated to Massachusetts in 1633. The name may refer to:

Frank Philbrook (born 1931), Canadian politician
George Philbrook (1884–1964), American athlete
James Philbrook (1924–1982), American actor
John N. Philbrook (1840–1923), American politician
Mary Philbrook (1872–1958), American lawyer
Simon Philbrook (born 1965), British cricket player
Warren C. Philbrook (1857–1933), American politician

See also
Philbrook, Minnesota
Philbrook Farm Inn, New Hampshire
Philbrook Museum of Art, Oklahoma
Samuel D. Philbrook House, Maine

References

Surnames of British Isles origin